The Shrimati Mithibai Motiram Kundnani College of Commerce & Economics, commonly known as M. M. K. College, is a private educational institution, located in Mumbai, Maharashtra, India. It is affiliated with Mumbai University and offers a variety of courses in the field of commerce.

History
The college was established in 1961 by Hyderabad (Sind) National Collegiate Board.

References

External links
 

Universities and colleges in Mumbai
Educational institutions established in 1961
1961 establishments in Maharashtra